A gable hood, English hood or gable headdress is an English woman's headdress of , so-called because its pointed shape resembles the gable of a house. The contemporary French hood was rounded in outline and unlike the gable hood, less conservative, displaying the front part of the hair.

Originally a simple pointed hood with decorated side panels called lappets and a veil at the back, over time the gable hood became a complex construction stiffened with buckram, with a box-shaped back and two tube-shaped hanging veils at 90-degree angles; the hanging veils and lappets could be pinned up in a variety of ways to make complex headdresses.

On average, it consisted of four parts; the paste, lappets, veil and decorative jewels (for the most aristocratic only). The paste was a white, stiffened version of the coif, with drawstrings at the back to adjust to the wearer's head. Then, the lappets were pinned to the paste, and either left to hang or pinned to the side of the head. Then, the veil. The jewels were mounted on a stiff foundation that could be sewn to the paste, acting not only as decoration but as something to create a more rigid structure. A striped silk undercap could also be worn to fully cover the hair.

Gallery

See also
 1500–1550 in Western European fashion
 Margaret Beaufort
 Catherine of Aragon
 Jane Seymour
 Mary Boleyn

References
 Ashelford, Jane: The Art of Dress: Clothing and Society 1500–1914, Abrams, 1996. 
 Ashelford, Jane: A Visual History of Costume: The Sixteenth Century, Drama Books, 1983.

External links

 Tudor Gable Headdress: A Portfolio of Images
 Tudor and Elizabethan Coifs

Headgear
English clothing
History of clothing (Western fashion)
16th-century fashion